François de Boffa was a Swiss fencer. He competed in the men's sabre event at the 1900 Summer Olympics.

References

External links

Year of birth missing
Year of death missing
Swiss male fencers
Olympic fencers of Switzerland
Fencers at the 1900 Summer Olympics
Place of birth missing